Miyanku (also, Mean’ku and Mianku) is a village and municipality in the Masally Rayon of Azerbaijan.  It has a population of 1,278.

References 

Populated places in Masally District